HD 158614 is a visual binary star system in the equatorial constellation of Ophiuchus. The system is visible to the naked eye with a combined apparent visual magnitude of +5.31. It is located at a distance of 53.3 light years from the Sun based on parallax, but is drifting closer with a radial velocity of −77 km/s and is predicted to come to within  in around 196,000 years. The system has been included as a candidate member of the Zeta Herculis moving group. However, chemical abundances appear to rule that out.

The pair were found to be a double star by F. G. W. Struve in 1827 and given the catalogue identifier Σ 2173 (now STF 2173). Since then it has completed multiple orbits, yielding orbital elements showing a period of 46.3 years and an eccentricity of 0.17. The two components have similar spectra that match a stellar classification of G9IV-V. They show almost no luminosity variation; one of the pair appears to vary by 0.002 in magnitude. Both components have a slightly lower mass than the Sun: 96% and 95%, respectively. The system is estimated to be 12.3 billion years old.

This binary was included in a search for brown dwarfs that turned up no large companions.

See also 
 Zeta Herculis

References

G-type subgiants
Binary stars
Zeta Herculis Moving Group

Ophiuchus (constellation)
Durchmusterung objects
0678
158614
085667
6516